The Beach volleyball Mediterranean Games Tournament was first Contested in the 15th Mediterranean Games Event in Spain, Almería for both men and women.

Men's tournament

History

Men, Medals Summary

Women's tournament

History

Women, Medals Summary

References
Volleyball Info 2005 Games 
2009 Mediterranean Games INFO 

 
Recurring sporting events established in 2005
Mediterranean Games